Emma Wengberg (born 28 November 1987) is a Swedish badminton player. In 2009, she won the Turkey International tournament in the women's doubles event partnered with Emelie Lennartsson. In 2011, she and Lennartsson also won the Scottish International tournament. In 2014, she won the Norwegian International tournament in the women's doubles event with Tilde Iversen of Denmark. In 2015, she won the Portugal and Finnish International tournaments in the mixed doubles event partnered with Filip Michael Duwall Myhren, and also won the women's doubles title at the Finland partnered with Clara Nistad. In March 2015, she and Nistad won the Polish International tournament after beat the English pair Chloe Birch and Jessica Pugh. In 2017, she won the women's doubles title at the Swedish International Series tournament with Nistad.

Achievements

BWF Grand Prix 
The BWF Grand Prix has two level such as Grand Prix and Grand Prix Gold. It is a series of badminton tournaments, sanctioned by Badminton World Federation (BWF) since 2007.

Women's doubles

 BWF Grand Prix Gold tournament
 BWF Grand Prix tournament

BWF International Challenge/Series
Women's doubles

Mixed doubles

 BWF International Challenge tournament
 BWF International Series tournament
 BWF Future Series tournament

References

External links

 

1987 births
Living people
Swedish female badminton players
21st-century Swedish women